Catholic Education in the Diocese of Cairns, Australia, educates over 11,200 students from north in the Torres Strait, west to the Atherton Tablelands, and as far as Tully in the South. There are 29 Catholic Schools in the Diocese, including primary, secondary, college and boarding.

The Catholic Education Services office is located in Cairns, on the corner of Lake and Minnie Street, and takes all enquires for the Diocese.

List of schools and colleges

References 
 Catholic Education Services 'Schools Guide – Enrolment information & Specialties'

See also 
List of schools in Far North Queensland

Education in Queensland